Chuang Chia-jung and Hsieh Su-wei were the defending champions, and won in the final 6–3, 6–0, against Vera Dushevina and Maria Kirilenko.

Seeds

  Chuang Chia-jung /  Hsieh Su-wei (champions)
  Ekaterina Makarova /  Shahar Pe'er (quarterfinals)
  Vera Dushevina  /  Maria Kirilenko (final)
  Jill Craybas  /   Marina Erakovic  (semifinals)

Draw

Draw

External links
Draw

Hansol Korea Open
Korea Open (tennis)